The World Colored Middleweight Championship was a title awarded to black boxers in the late nineteenth and early twentieth centuries. This was the only recognized middleweight championship available to blacks prior to Tiger Flowers (5 August 1895 - 16 November 1927) winning the world middleweight boxing championship by defeating Harry Greb on 26 November 1926.  

Two world colored middleweight champions, George Byer and Sam Langford, went on to win the World Colored Heavyweight Championship.

Negro Middleweight Champion
Johnny Banks, "The Darkey Wizard", claimed the Negro Middleweight Championship of the World during the 1880s. He lost in a title fight on 26 Jan 1887 in New York City to James Desverney when he was disqualified in the ninth round on a foul. (Desverney apparently never defended the title.) Banks's next fight was with future colored middleweight champ Ed Binney in Boston, in which they drew in the scheduled 13 rounds. Another three rounds were tacked onto the bout and Binney won the fight.

Colored Champions
Harris Martin, "The Black Pearl", declared himself the world colored middleweight champion after beating "Black Frank" Taylor in Minneapolis, Minnesota on 2 May 1887, when he knocked out Taylor in the 38th or 40th round of their bout.  Martin lost his title to Ed Binney on 30 November 1891  in San Francisco, California. 

On 29 February 1892, The Black Pearl fought Charley Turner, "The Stockton Cyclone", in his first fight since losing the title to Binney and was defeated. Turner claimed the title but never defended it.  Binney was considered the lineal champ; he had also defeated the holder of the Negro Middleweight title.

20th Century
From 1912 to 1924, there was a continuous line of colored middleweight champs. The last title holder of this era was Larry Estridge, who defeated previous title holder Panama Joe Gans  in a fight at Yankee Stadium on July 26, 1924. He defended the title against Gans at Queensboro Stadium in Long Island City, Queens, New York on August 11th of that year. It was his sole title defense. 

Gans had won the title from George Robinson in Madison Square Garden on October 8, 1920. He defended the title twice in 1923, racking up no decisions (and thus keeping his title) against Whitey Black on May 14th in Detroit and against Tiger Flowers  in Toledo, Ohio on May 25th.  He knocked out Willie Walker via a 9th round K.O. in New York City on June 30th.      

After Tiger Flowers lost the title in 1926, there was one more African American middleweight champ, Gorilla Jones, who reigned for six months in 1932. There would not be another black middleweight champ until Sugar Ray Robinson in 1950.

Revived Title
The colored middleweight title was revived in the early 1940s. Charley Burley, who had been the colored welterweight champ, fought Holman Williams for the championship on 14 August 14, 1942 and won on a 9th round TKO. Williams won the title on a decision in their rematch on 16 October 1942, then lost the title on 15 January 1943 to the Cocoa Kid in a 12-round decision. The Kid never defended the title.

List of champions

See also
World Colored Heavyweight Championship
World Colored Light Heavyweight Championship
World Colored Welterweight Championship
Black Heavyweight Championship
World Negro Middleweight Championship

References

Defunct boxing titles